Phytomyza hellebori is a species of leaf miner fly in the family Agromyzidae. The larvae can be found in Europe feeding on hellebore (Helleborus species).

References

Phytomyza
Brachyceran flies of Europe
Insects described in 1872
Leaf miners
Taxa named by Johann Heinrich Kaltenbach